Sidi M'Cid Bridge is a 164 m long suspension bridge across the Rhumel River in Constantine, Algeria. It was opened to traffic in April 1912 and until 1929 was the highest bridge in the world at 175 m. The bridge was designed by French engineer Ferdinand Arnodin and links the Casbah to Sidi M'Cid hill. The bridge underwent restoration in 2000 when 12 of its cables were replaced by the Algerian company SAPTA.

History
Constantine was an important city of 50,000 people when Émile Morinaud took over as the mayor and member of parliament in 1901. During his time in power till 1934, he went about modernizing the city. The Sidi M'Cid bridge, the Sidi Rached bridge and many other prominent buildings were constructed in this period. The bridge remained the highest bridge in the world till the Royal Gorge Bridge in Colorado opened in November 1929.

The Monument of the Dead is on one side of the bridge on the Sidi M'Cid hill. The monument is a replica of the Arch of Trajan in Timgad and commemorates the people of Constantine who laid down their lives fighting for France in the First World War. There is a natural bridge below the Sidi M'Cid bridge which blocks the view of the river from the bridge.

See also

List of longest suspension bridge spans
List of bridges by length
List of highest bridges in the world
List of tallest bridges in the world
Salah Bey Viaduct
Sidi Rached Viaduct
Bab El Kantra Bridge

References

External Links 

 Images of Sidi M'Cid Bridge in Manar al-Athar digital heritage photo archive

Suspension bridges in Algeria
Bridges in Constantine, Algeria
Landmarks in Algeria
Buildings and structures in Constantine Province
Transport in Constantine, Algeria
Bridges in Algeria
Bridges completed in 1912
1912 establishments in Algeria